Luke Kennard may refer to:

 Luke Kennard (poet) (born 1981), British poet and critic
 Luke Kennard (basketball) (born 1996), American basketball player

See also

 Lucas Kennard, Hawaiian American-football player on the 2007 Hawaii Warriors football team
 Kennard (surname)